Chloridazon-catechol dioxygenase is an enzyme that catalyzes the chemical reaction

5-amino-4-chloro-2-(2,3-dihydroxyphenyl)-3(2H)-pyridazinone + O2  5-amino-4-chloro-2-(2-hydroxymuconoyl)-3(2H)-pyridazinone

Thus, the two substrates of this enzyme are 5-amino-4-chloro-2-(2,3-dihydroxyphenyl)-3(2H)-pyridazinone and oxygen, whereas its product is 5-amino-4-chloro-2-(2-hydroxymuconoyl)-3(2H)-pyridazinone.

This enzyme belongs to the family of oxidoreductases, specifically those acting on single donors with O2 as oxidant and incorporation of two atoms of oxygen into the substrate (oxygenases). The oxygen incorporated need not be derived from O2.  The systematic name of this enzyme class is 5-amino-4-chloro-2-(2,3-dihydroxyphenyl)-3(2H)-pyridazinone 1,2-oxidoreductase (decyclizing). It employs one cofactor, iron.

References

 
 

EC 1.13.11
Iron enzymes
Enzymes of unknown structure